There have been two baronetcies created for persons with the surname Houston, one in the Baronetage of Nova Scotia and one in the Baronetage of the United Kingdom, both extinct.

The Houston Baronetcy, of Houston in the County of Renfrew, was created in the Baronetage of Nova Scotia on 29 February 1668 for Patrick Houston. The third Baronet represented Linlithgowshire in Parliament. After the death of the eighth Baronet in circa 1835, no-one successfully claimed the title, although there were living heirs.

The Houston Baronetcy, of West Toxteth in the City of Liverpool, was created in the Baronetage of the United Kingdom on 17 January 1922 for the shipowner and Conservative politician Robert Houston. The title became extinct on his death in 1926. His wife Lucy, Lady Houston, was a benefactor and philanthropist.

Houston baronets, of Houston (1668)
Sir Patrick Houston, 1st Baronet (died 1696)
Sir John Houston, 2nd Baronet (died 1717)
Sir John Houston, 3rd Baronet (died 1722)
Sir John Houston, 4th Baronet (died 1751)
Sir Patrick Houston, 5th Baronet (–1762)
Sir Patrick Houston, 6th Baronet (c. 1743–1785
Sir George Houston, 7th Baronet (c. 1745–1795)
Sir Patrick Houston, 8th Baronet (died c. 1835)

Houston baronets, of West Toxteth (1922)
Sir Robert Paterson Houston, 1st Baronet (1853–1926)

References

Extinct baronetcies in the Baronetage of Nova Scotia
Extinct baronetcies in the Baronetage of the United Kingdom